Blues A-Plenty is an album recorded by American jazz saxophonist Johnny Hodges featuring performances recorded in 1958 and released on the Verve label.

Reception

The Allmusic site awarded the album 3 stars.

Track listing
All compositions by Johnny Hodges except as indicated
 "I Didn't Know About You" (Duke Ellington, Bob Russell) - 3:35
 "Cool Your Motor" - 3:39
 "Gone With the Wind" (Allie Wrubel, Herb Magidson) - 3:21
 "Honey Hill" - 4:05
 "Blues-a-Plenty" - 3:26 
 "Don't Take Your Love from Me" (Henry Nemo) - 3:43
 "Saturday Afternoon Blues" - 6:02
 "Satin Doll" (Ellington) - 5:04
 "Reeling and Rocking" - 9:35

Personnel
Johnny Hodges - alto saxophone
Roy Eldridge - trumpet
Vic Dickenson - trombone
Ben Webster - tenor saxophone
Billy Strayhorn - piano
Jimmy Woode - bass
Sam Woodyard - drums

References

Johnny Hodges albums
1958 albums
Verve Records albums
Albums produced by Norman Granz